The following outline is provided as an overview of and topical guide to futures studies:

Futures studies (also called futurology) – study of postulating possible, probable, and preferable futures and the worldviews and myths that underlie them. There is a debate as to whether this discipline is an art or science. In general, it can be considered as a branch of the social sciences and parallel to the field of history. History studies the past, futures studies considers the future. Futurology (colloquially called "futures" by many of the field's practitioners) seeks to understand what is likely to continue and what could plausibly change. Part of the discipline thus seeks a systematic and pattern-based understanding of past and present, and to determine the likelihood of future events and trends.

General concepts
 Accelerating change
 Calculating demand forecast accuracy
 Clarke's three laws
 Collaborative planning, forecasting, and replenishment
 Causal layered analysis
 Coolhunting
 Decision support systems
 Digital library (initiatives)
 DIKW pyramid – Harlan Cleveland
 Emerging technologies
 List of emerging technologies
 End of civilization
 Eschatology
 Failure mode and effects analysis
 Forecasting
 Foresight
 Future
 Future energy development
 Global Consciousness Project
 Hubbert peak theory
 Interdependence
 Kardashev scale
 Kondratiev wave
 Malthusian catastrophe
 Memetics
 Moore's law
 Morphological analysis
 Neo-futurism
 Omega Point
 Optimism bias
 Planetary phase of civilization
 Planning
 Potential cultural impact of extraterrestrial contact
 Prediction
 Prediction market
 Psychohistory (fictional)
 Race of the future
 Reference class forecasting
 Risks to civilization, humans and planet Earth
 Scenario analysis
 Social network analysis
 Strategic foresight
 Systems theory
 Technological singularity
 Technology
 Technology forecasting
 Theory of constraints
 Thought experiment
 Transhumanism
 Twelve leverage points
 Ultimate fate of the universe

Futures techniques 
 Anticipatory thinking 
 Causal layered analysis (CLA)
 Environmental scanning
 Scenario method
 Horizon scanning
 Delphi method
 Future history
 Monitoring
 Backcasting (eco-history)
 Cross-impact analysis
 Futures workshops
 Failure mode and effects analysis
 Futures wheel
 Technology roadmapping
 Social network analysis
 Systems engineering
 Trend analysis
 Morphological analysis
 Technology forecasting
 Theory U

Organizations
 The Arlington Institute
 Association of Professional Futurists
 Bakken Museum
 Club of Rome
 Copenhagen Institute for Futures Studies
 Foundation For the Future
 Future of Humanity Institute
 Future of Life Institute
 The Futures Academy
 Global Business Network
 Global Scenario Group
 Hudson Institute
 Institute for Futures Research
 Institute for the Future
 International Institute of Forecasters
 Long Now Foundation
 NASA Institute for Advanced Concepts
 Naval Postgraduate School
 RAND Corporation
 Devi Ahilya University
 Tellus Institute
 The Millennium Project
 World Future Society
 World Futures Studies Federation

Research centers
 Copenhagen Institute for Futures Studies
 Institute for the Future, Palo Alto, California
 Tellus Institute, Boston, Massachusetts
 The Futures Academy, Dublin Institute of Technology, Ireland
 World Futures Studies Federation, world

Academic programs
See also: Acceleration Studies Foundation's annotated list of 10 primary and 60+ secondary graduate futures studies programs.

Australia: Australian Catholic University
Australia: Swinburne University of Technology
Argentina: Universidad Nacional de La Plata
Australia: Curtin University of Technology
Australia: University of the Sunshine Coast
Canada: OCAD University
Colombia: Universidad Externado de Colombia
Colombia: Uniandes
Czech Republic: Charles University of Prague
Finland: Turku School of Economics and Business Administration
France: CNAM
Hungary: Corvinus University of Budapest
India: Devi Ahilya University
India: University of Kerala
Italy: Gregorian University
Mexico: Monterrey Institute of Technology
Romania: Babeș-Bolyai University
Russia: Moscow State University
South Africa: Stellenbosch University
South Korea: Korea Advanced Institute of Science and Technology
Taiwan: Tamkang University
Taiwan: Fo Guang University
US: University of Hawaii
US: University of Houston Longest running futures degree program in the world.
US: Stanford University
US: Regent University

Futurologists

Publications

Books
 The Age of Spiritual Machines: When Computers Exceed Human Intelligence
 Brave New World
 The Communist Manifesto
 Future Primitive
 Future Shock
 Futurewise
 The Limits to Growth
 Our Final Hour
 The Revenge of Gaia
 The Singularity Is Near: When Humans Transcend Biology
 The Skeptical Environmentalist
 The Third Wave, Alvin Toffler
 Physics of the Impossible
 Physics of the Future: How Science Will Shape Human Destiny and Our Daily Lives by the Year 2100

Periodicals and monographs
 Foresight
Future Orientation Index
 Futures
 International Journal of Forecasting
 Journal of Futures Studies
 Technological Forecasting and Social Change

See also
 List of futurologists
 Index of articles related to the theory of constraints
 Transhumanism

References

External links

 – list of recent publications from the Hawaii Research Center for Futures Studies
 15 Global Challenges from The Millennium Project

Futures studies
Futures studies